Two-time defending champions Alfie Hewett and Gordon Reid defeated Gustavo Fernández and Shingo Kunieda in the final, 7–6(7–5), 7–6(7–5) to win the men's doubles wheelchair tennis title at the 2022 French Open. It was their tenth consecutive major title.

Seeds

Draw

Finals

References

External links
 Draw

Wheelchair Men's Doubles
French Open, 2022 Men's Doubles